Star World (formerly known as Star Plus) is an English language entertainment television channel originally launched on 15 December 1991 as Star Entertainment by Star TV in Hong Kong as the old iteration of Star Plus.

On 30 March 1996, the channel was split into two, when the former became Star World in East and Southeast Asia part of STAR TV's rebranding, and the latter retained the Star Plus name in India and the Middle East. However, after Star (subsequently acquired by News Corporation) ended its partnership with Zee TV on 30 June 2000, Star Plus was transformed into a Hindi-language channel on 1 July 2000, with Star World being already introduced in the region as an English entertainment replacement.

The channel's programming line-up mostly consists of entertainment television programmes from the United States, the United Kingdom and sometimes Australia and New Zealand to appeal to English-speaking locals as well as the expatriate population of Taiwan.

History
Star World was first launched on 15 December 1991 as Star Entertainment with the very launching programme The Bold and the Beautiful was telecast on CBS (including WCBS-2 New York City and KCBS-2 Los Angeles) as very first programme. It was an 24-hour English language general entertainment channel showed dramas, movie and variety shows from the United States, United Kingdom, Australia and New Zealand with ATV World and TVB Pearl being the English language general entertainment channel counterpart operated the channel joint venture with NBC and CBS which uplinked English channel WNBC-4 New York City, WCBS-2 New York City, KNBC-4 Los Angeles and KCBS-2 Los Angeles from Hong Kong. The channel was broadcast across the continent of Asia, reaching from the Far East to the Middle East, as with AsiaSat 1's footprint. Star TV have since regionalised the channel to serve its huge viewerships. On 1 July 1992, Star Entertainment was officially renamed as Star Plus.

One year later, Star Entertainment was backed by two major Hollywood conglomerate film studios and television production including 20th Century Studios (former 20th Century Fox) and 20th Television (former 20th Century Television).

On 1 May 1994, All movie backed by one major Hollywood conglomerate film studios including 20th Century Studios (former 20th Century Fox) was officially moved from Star Plus to Star Movies because due to Star Movies was officially opened. Star Plus continue to be an English language general entertainment channel.

On 30 March 1996, STAR TV split Star Plus' beam into two, in effect, providing two separate services for different regional audiences within STAR TV's footprint. This enabled the channel to provide appropriate programming and viewing time for viewers from different regions in Asia. Star Plus would serve viewers in India and the Middle East from then on, while the new Star World channel welcomed those in East and Southeast Asia. Star TV converted Star Plus into Hindi entertainment channel with some English content programming. Earlier, STAR TV had a joint venture with Zee Telefilms which uplinked Hindi channel Zee TV from Hong Kong. But that partnership with that channel ended on 30 June 2000, resulted the new Star World channel as English entertainment replacement on 1 July 2000 for India and the Middle East.

On 1 October 2017, Hong Kong and Southeast Asian version of Star World was rebranded to Fox Life. The Good Fight was the last program to air before re-brand (Bolt of Talent in Philippine feed). Star World brand remains in versions broadcast to the Middle East, Taiwan, India as well as other South Asian markets.

On 1 February 2020, the Taiwanese version closed down and some programs are moved to Fox. However, two years later, on 1 January 2022, Fox Taiwan officially handover back return to Star World Taiwan was officially relaunching ceremony in held at Taiwan.

Operating channels

Current channels
 Star World Taiwan - broadcast times NST; selected programs are not the same as the Asia feed, including local commercials
 Star World HD Middle East & North Africa - broadcast times KSA, UAE; including Channel [V] programs.

Former channels
 Star World Vietnam - broadcast times VN; selected programs are not the same as the Asia feed, including local commercials
 Star World HD Asia - same as the Asia feed except for the logo and commercial feed; available in selected territories only
 Star World Asia - broadcast times HKT/SIN and JKT/BKK; simulcast with the Middle East feed at 00:00 to 06:00 (HK/SIN)
 Star World Philippines - broadcast times PH; selected programs are not the same as Asia feed including local commercials and few of the local programs; a subsidiary of Fox Networks Group Philippines
 Star World HD Philippines - same as the Philippines feed except for the logo and commercial feed; launched on 1 March 2012; a subsidiary of Fox Networks Group Philippines
 Star World HD Vietnam - same as the Vietnam feed except for the logo and commercial feed
 Star World HD India - same as the India feed except for the logo and commercial feed; launched on 15 April 2011; only available in India and Nepal
 Star World Premiere HD - broadcast times IND; a premium channel launched on 26 September 2013 in India offering the latest seasons of the biggest shows in American television.

 Star World India - broadcast times IND; this has different content from the other feeds; this is the only feed managed by Star India (not by Fox Networks Group)

References

External links
Star World Taiwan website
Star World MENA website

Television stations in Mumbai
Television stations in Hong Kong
Cable television in India
Television channels and stations established in 1991
Women's interest channels
English-language television stations
Mass media in Southeast Asia
Disney television networks